Comandante General Gregorio Aráoz de Lamadrid (or "de La Madrid"; 28 November 1795 in San Miguel de Tucumán – 5 January 1857 in Buenos Aires) was an Argentine military officer and briefly, governor of several provinces like Córdoba, Mendoza and his native province of Tucumán.

Lamadrid fought beside General Belgrano and General San Martín during the Argentine War of Independence, as a prominent cavalry officer of the Army of the North, where he won a number of famous small actions in Upper Peru such as Tambo Nuevo in 1813 and Culpina in 1816.  As a general commanding Unitarian forces in the civil wars which followed, Lamadrid fought alongside General José María Paz in the battles of La Tablada, San Roque, and Oncativo.

Like many other nineteenth century Argentines prominent in public life, Lamadrid was a freemason.

Lamadrid's body is buried in the Cathedral of San Miguel de Tucumán.

The football club Club Atlético General Lamadrid of the Metropolitan 4th Division are named in his honour.

References

External links 

Biografía 

1795 births
1857 deaths
Argentine generals
People of the Argentine War of Independence
People from San Miguel de Tucumán
Governors of Mendoza Province
Governors of Córdoba Province, Argentina
Argentine Freemasons